Brazil competed at the 1976 Summer Olympics in Montreal, Quebec, Canada. 93 competitors, 86 men and 7 women, took part in 48 events in 12 sports. Brazilians athletes obtained two bronze medals, repeating the same performance of the 1972 Summer Olympics. The sailors, Reinaldo Conrad and Peter Ficker, won the medal in Flying Dutchman. It was the second bronze medal conquered by Reinaldo Conrad after the 1968 Olympics. The jumper João Carlos de Oliveira won the medal in men's triple jump. He was the current record holder from altitude at the 1975 Pan American Games in Mexico City. The winner was two time defending champion Viktor Saneyev from Soviet Union.

Medalists

Athletics

Men
Track & road events

Field events

Women
Track & road events

Field events

Boxing

Men

Diving

Men

Fencing

One male fencer represented Brazil in 1976.
 Men
Ranks given are within the pool.

Football

First round

Group A

 **Nigeria withdrew

Quarter-finals

Semi-finals

Bronze Medal match

Team Roster
(1) Carlos 
(2) Rosemiro
(3) Tecão
(4) Edinho
(5) Júnior 
(6) Alberto
(7) Marinho 
(8) Batista
(9) Eudes
(10) Erivelto
(11) Santos
(12) Mauro
(13) Julinho
(14) Chico Fraga 
(15) Jarbas
(16) Edval
(17) Zé Carlos
Coach: Cláudio Coutinho

Judo

Men

Rowing

Men

Sailing

Open

Shooting

Open

Swimming

Men

Women

Volleyball

Preliminary round

Pool B

|}

* Egypt withdrew from the tournament because of the Congolese-led boycott after they lost to Brazil 1–3 (5–15, 5–15, 15–13, 9–15) on 18 July. The result of that game was annulled.

|}

5th–8th semifinals

|}

7th place match

|}

Team Roster
Bebeto de Freitas
Sergio Danilas
Alexandre Abeid
Eloi Lacerda
Antonio Carlos Moreno
Bernard Rajzman
William Carvalho da Silva
Celso Kalache
Suiço Rosat
Fernando Roscio
Paulo Peterle
José Roberto Guimarães
 Head coaches: Russo Sevciuc and Carlos Souto

Weightlifting

Men

References

External links
Official Olympic Reports
International Olympic Committee results database
COB

Nations at the 1976 Summer Olympics
1976 Summer Olympics
Olympics